Hughton is a surname. Notable people with the surname include:

Chris Hughton (born 1958), Irish footballer and manager
Cian Hughton (born 1989), Irish footballer
Henry Hughton (born 1959), English footballer

See also
Houghton (disambiguation)